Cătălin Zmărăndescu (born 26 January 1973) is a former Romanian professional mixed martial artist, kickboxer and boxer.

Kickboxing record

|-  bgcolor="#c5d2ea"
| 2006-11-11 || NC ||align=left| Ciprian Sora || Local Kombat 23 || Râmnicu Vâlcea, Romania || No contest || || 11-1-1
|-  bgcolor="#FFBBBB"
| 2006-04-14 || Loss ||align=left| Ciprian Sora || Local Kombat 20 || Râmnicu Vâlcea, Romania || Decision || || 11-1-1
|-  bgcolor="#CCFFCC"
| 2006-03-10 || Win ||align=left| Stanislav Batchevanov || Local Kombat 19 || Iași, Romania || Decision || || 11-0-1
|-  bgcolor="#CCFFCC"
| 2005-11-11 || Win ||align=left| Josip Bodrožić || Local Kombat 17 || Brașov, Romania || Decision || || 10-0-1
|-  bgcolor="#CCFFCC"
| 2005-05-27 || Win ||align=left| Jan Wessels || Total Kombat 5 || Tulcea, Romania || TKO (leg kicks) || || 9-0-1
|-  bgcolor="#CCFFCC"
| 2005-02-04 || Win ||align=left| Ciprian Popa || Total Kombat 3 || Pitești, Romania || KO (knee)||  || 8-0-1
|-  bgcolor="#CCFFCC"
| 2004-12-17 || Win ||align=left| Cristian Delgado || Total Kombat 2 || Bacău, Romania || Decision || || 7-0-1
|-  bgcolor="#c5d2ea"
| 2004-11-04 || Draw ||align=left| Brecht Wallis || Total Kombat 1 || Brașov, Romania || Decision || || 6-0-1
|-  bgcolor="#CCFFCC"
| 2004-08-06 || Win ||align=left| Tamás Fehér || Gala Antena 1 || Timișoara, Romania || KO (right hook)||  || 6-0-0
|-  bgcolor="#CCFFCC"
| 2004-06-10 || Win ||align=left| Hayes Jemide || Extrem Kung Fu 3 || Bucharest, Romania || Decision||  || 5-0-0
|-  bgcolor="#CCFFCC"
| 2004-05-14 || Win ||align=left| Gheorghe Lazăr || Local Kombat 6 || Galați, Romania || KO (punches)||  || 4-0-0
|-  bgcolor="#CCFFCC"
| 2004-03-26 || Win ||align=left| Gábor Koza || Local Kombat 5 || Brașov, Romania || KO (knee to the body) || || 3-0-0
|-  bgcolor="#CCFFCC"
| 2003-08-23 || Win ||align=left| Aurel Bococi || Local Kombat 1 || Ploiești, Romania || Decision||  || 2-0-0
|-  bgcolor="#CCFFCC"
| 2003-06-20 || Win ||align=left| Goran Vidaković || Provocarea Campionilor || Bucharest, Romania || KO || || 1-0-0
|-
| colspan=9 | Legend:

See also 
List of male mixed martial artists
List of male kickboxers

References

1973 births
Living people
Romanian male kickboxers
Heavyweight kickboxers 
Romanian male mixed martial artists
Romanian sanshou practitioners
Super heavyweight mixed martial artists
Mixed martial artists utilizing sanshou
Mixed martial artists utilizing boxing
Bodyguards 
SUPERKOMBAT kickboxers
SUPERKOMBAT mixed martial artists
Sportspeople from Bucharest